Heaven Bound or Heavenbound may refer to:

Music
"Heaven Bound", a 1998 song by Shana
"Heaven Bound (I'm Ready)", a song written by Dennis Linde and recorded by the Oak Ridge Boys in 1991
"Heavenbound", a 1989 song by DC Talk from DC Talk
Heavenbound (album), a 2000 album by Scarub

Other
Heaven Bound (play), a morality play staged annually at the Big Bethel AME Church in Atlanta, Georgia.